Buck Creek Gap (el. ) is a mountain pass along the Blue Ridge Mountains.  NC 80 connects with the Blue Ridge Parkway at the gap, where it travelers can go either towards Burnsville, Marion, Mount Mitchell or Little Switzerland.  A scenic overlook is located at the gap, along NC 80; which is sometimes also used as a staging area for motorcycle enthusiasts.  The gap is also along the Eastern Continental Divide and the McDowell–Yancey county line.

References

Landforms of McDowell County, North Carolina
Landforms of Yancey County, North Carolina
Mountain passes of North Carolina
Transportation in McDowell County, North Carolina
Transportation in Yancey County, North Carolina
Blue Ridge Parkway